These are The Official UK Charts Company's UK Dance Chart number one hits of 2003. The dates listed in the menus below represent the Saturday after the Sunday the chart was announced, as per the way the dates are given in chart publications such as the ones produced by Billboard, Guinness, and Virgin.

Chart history

See also
List of number-one singles of 2003 (UK) 
List of UK Independent Singles Chart number ones of 2003
List of UK Rock & Metal Singles Chart number ones of 2003

References

External links
Dance Singles Chart at The Official UK Charts Company
UK Top 40 Dance Singles at BBC Radio 1

2003
2003 in British music
2003 record charts
Incomplete lists from May 2011